Paul Groves is a British poet and critic whose work has appeared in many literary periodicals and has won several prizes since he was first published in 1968. He was for twenty years a schoolteacher, after which he spent two decades as a Creative Writing lecturer. He has given countless readings, both live and on television and radio. He was born in Gloucester in 1947, lived in the Forest of Dean, and currently resides in Somerset.

Publications
 Academe (Seren, 1988)
 Ménage à Trois (Seren, 1995)
 Eros and Thanatos (Seren, 1999)
 Wowsers (Seren, 2002)
 Country Boy (Starborn Books, 2007)
 Qwerty (Seren, 2008)

Awards and recognition
 Eric Gregory Award from The Society of Authors
 Twice winner of The Times Literary Supplement International Poetry Prize

External links
Paul Groves at Seren Books

References

20th-century English poets
Living people
1947 births
People from Gloucester
Alumni of the University of Wales, Newport
21st-century British poets
21st-century English male writers
21st-century English writers
English male poets
20th-century English male writers